A heritage railway or heritage railroad (US usage) is a railway operated as living history to re-create or preserve railway scenes of the past. Heritage railways are often old railway lines preserved in a state depicting a period (or periods) in the history of rail transport.

Definition 
The British Office of Rail and Road defines heritage railways as follows:...'lines of local interest', museum railways or tourist railways that have retained or assumed the character and appearance and operating practices of railways of former times. Several lines that operate in isolation provide genuine transport facilities, providing community links. Most lines constitute tourist or educational attractions in their own right. Much of the rolling stock and other equipment used on these systems is original and is of historic value in its own right. Many systems aim to replicate both the look and operating practices of historic former railways companies.

Infrastructure 

Heritage railway lines have historic rail infrastructure which has been substituted (or made obsolete) in modern rail systems. Historical installations, such as hand-operated points, water cranes, and rails fastened with hand-hammered rail spikes, are characteristic features of heritage lines. Unlike tourist railways, which primarily carry tourists and have modern installations and vehicles, heritage-line infrastructure creates views and soundscapes of the past in operation.

Operation 
Due to a lack of modern technology or the desire for historical accuracy, railway operations can be handled with traditional practices such as the use of tokens. Heritage infrastructure and operations often require the assignment of roles, based on historical occupations, to the railway staff. Some, or all, staff and volunteers, including Station masters and signalmen, sometimes wearing period-appropriate attire, can be seen on some heritage railways. Most heritage railways use heritage rolling stock, although modern rail vehicles can be used to showcase railway scenes with historical-line infrastructure.

Cost 
While some heritage railways are profitable tourist attractions, many are not-for-profit entities; some of the latter depend on enthusiastic volunteers for upkeep and operations to supplement revenue from traffic and visitors. Still other heritage railways offer a viable public-transit option, and can maintain operations with revenue from regular riders or government subsidies.

Development

Children's railways 

Children's railways are extracurricular educational institutions where children and teenagers learn about railway work; they are often functional, passenger-carrying narrow-gauge rail lines. The railways developed in the USSR during the Soviet era. Many were called "Pioneer railways", after the youth organisation of that name. The first children's railway opened in Moscow in 1932 and, at the breakup of the USSR, 52 children's railways existed in the country. Although the fall of communist governments has led to the closure of some, preserved children's railways are still functioning in post-Soviet states and Eastern European countries.

Many children's railways were built on parkland in urban areas. Unlike many industrial areas typically served by a narrow-gauge railway, parks were free of redevelopment. Child volunteers and socialist fiscal policy enabled the existence of many of these railways. Children's railways which still carry traffic have often retained their original infrastructure and rolling stock, including vintage steam locomotives; some have acquired heritage vehicles from other railways.

Examples of children's railways with steam locomotives include the Dresden Park Railway in Germany; the Gyermekvasút in Budapest; the Park Railway Maltanka in Poznań; the Košice Children's Railway in Slovakia, and the  gauge steam railway on the grounds of St Nicholas' School in Merstham, Surrey, which the children help operate with assistance from the East Surrey 16mm Group and other volunteers.

Mountain railways 

Creating passages for trains up steep hills and through mountain regions offers many obstacles which call for technical solutions. Steep grade railway technologies and extensive tunneling may be employed. The use of narrow gauge allows tighter curves in the track, and offers a smaller structure gauge and tunnel size. At high altitudes, construction and logistical difficulties, limited urban development and demand for transport and special rolling-stock requirements have left many mountain railways unmodernized. The engineering feats of past railway builders and views of pristine mountain scenes have made many railways in mountainous areas profitable tourist attractions.

Pit railways 
Pit railways have been in operation in underground mines all over the world. Small rail vehicles transport ore, waste rock, and workers through narrow tunnels. Sometimes trains were the sole mode of transport in the passages between the work sites and the mine entrance. The railway's loading gauge often dictated the cross-section of passages to be dug. At many mining sites, pit railways have been abandoned due to mine closure or adoption of new transportation equipment. Some show mines have a vintage pit railway and offer mantrip rides into the mine.

Underground railways 
The Metro 1 (officially the Millennium Underground Railway or M1), built from 1894 to 1896, is the oldest line of the Budapest Metro system and the second-oldest underground railway in the world. The M1 underwent major reconstruction during the 1980s and 1990s, and Line 1 now serves eight original stations whose original appearance has been preserved. In 2002, the line was listed as a UNESCO World Heritage Site. In the Deák Ferenc Square concourse's Millennium Underground Museum, many other artifacts of the metro's early history may be seen.

Heritage tramways 
Heritage tram lines that offer scheduled service on a certain route and showcase historic aspects of streetcar systems are usually operated by heritage vehicles. Heritage tramlines that operate on a rail network that mainly serves the interest of modern urban mobility have difficulty in exhibiting historic tramway infrastructure, apart from the car itself.  This kind of tramline is often operated mainly to attract tourists instead of providing urban access. Some technical aspects of historic tram infrastructure can prevent the use of a heritage line as an integral part of the public transport system. For example, heritage tramlines often lack handicapped access which is required by law in many countries. Heritage tramlines can be either newly installed lines (created in modern times, 1970s or later) or be surviving older tramlines that have retained use of historic trams for all or most of their scheduled service.

Rail tracks designated solely or mainly to heritage streetcar traffic offer best opportunities for preservation of historic streetcar scenes. Some heritage tramways use all-new construction while others make use of an existing, usually disused, freight railway, by installing overhead wires and passenger stops. In some cities, new heritage tramways have been installed in the city center, to attract tourists and shoppers. Proponents of such projects claim that using a simple, reliable form of transit from 50 or 100 years ago can bring history to life for 21st century users.  In serving certain types of transport needs, heritage tramways can turn out to be more economical than their modern counterparts, often with installations that can be built at a fraction of the cost of a corresponding modern standard. However, there are trade-offs; among other things, heritage systems can offer slower speeds, less capacity and higher upkeep costs due to use of non-industry-standard technology.

Around the world 
The first heritage railway to be rescued and run entirely by volunteers was the Talyllyn Railway in Wales. This narrow-gauge line, taken over by a group of enthusiasts in 1950, was the beginning of the preservation movement worldwide.

Argentina 

La Trochita (officially Viejo Expreso Patagónico, the Old Patagonian Express)
was declared a National Historic Monument by the Government of Argentina in 1999. Trains on the Patagonian  narrow-gauge railway use steam locomotives. The  railway runs through the foothills of the Andes between Esquel and El Maitén in Chubut Province and Ingeniero Jacobacci in Río Negro Province.

In southern Argentina, the Train of the End of the World to the Tierra del Fuego National Park is considered the world's southernmost functioning railway. Heritage railway operations started in 1994, after restoration of the old  (narrow-gauge) steam railway.

In Salta Province in northeastern Argentina, the Tren a las Nubes (Train to the Clouds) runs along  of  track in what is one of the highest railways in the world.

In the Misiones Province, more precisely in the Iguazú National Park, is the Ecological Train of the Forest. With a speed below 20 km per hour to avoid interfering with wildlife and the formations are propelled to liquefied petroleum gas (LPG), a non-polluting fuel.

The Villa Elisa Historic Train (operated by Ferroclub Central Entrerriano) runs steam trains between the cities of Villa Elisa and Caseros in Entre Ríos Province, covering  in 120 minutes.

Australia 

The world's second preserved railway, and the first outside the United Kingdom, was Australia's Puffing Billy Railway. Just about over half of Australia's heritage lines are operated by narrow gauge tank engines, much like the narrow gauge lines of the United Kingdom.

Austria 
It runs on summer weekends, connecting Reichenau an der Rax to the nearby Höllental.

Belgium 
Flanders, Belgium's northern Dutch-speaking region, has the Dendermonde–Puurs Steam Railway; whereas Wallonia, with its strong history of 19th century heavy industries, has the Chemin de fer à vapeur des Trois Vallées and PFT operates the Chemin de Fer du Bocq.

Canada

Railways

Tramways 

Heritage streetcar lines:
 Downtown Historic Railway, in Vancouver, B.C. Replaced temporarily by the Olympic Line during the 2010 Vancouver Olympics, abandoned in 2012.
 Nelson Electric Tramway, in Nelson, B.C.: two streetcars - Car 400 (formerly BCER, owned by the Royal BC Museum, operational since 1999) and Car 23 (operational since 1992) operate on a 1.2 km route from City wharf to Lakeside Park.
 High Level Bridge Streetcar, in Edmonton, Alberta.
 Whitehorse trolley, in Whitehorse, Yukon. Closed in 2019.
Museums with operational heritage streetcar lines:
 Halton County Radial Railway, in Rockwood, Ontario
 Canadian Railway Museum, in Delson/Saint-Constant, Quebec
 Heritage Park Historical Village, in Calgary, Alberta
 Fort Edmonton Park in Edmonton, Alberta, operated by the Edmonton Radial Railway society along with the High Level Bridge Streetcar.

Finland 

On the Finnish state-owned rail network, the section between Olli and Porvoo is a dedicated museum line. In southern Finland, it is the only line with many structural details abandoned by the rest of the network which regularly carries passenger traffic. Wooden sleepers, gravel ballast and low rail weight with no overhead catenary make it uniquely historical. Along the line, the Hinthaara railway station and the Porvoo railway station area are included in the National Board of Antiquities' inventory of cultural environments of national significance in Finland. Also on the list is scenery in the Porvoonjoki Valley, through which the line passes.

The Jokioinen Museum Railway is a stretch of preserved narrow-gauge railway between Humppila and Jokioinen. Nykarleby Järnväg is a stretch of rebuilt narrow-gauge railway on the bank of the old Kovjoki–Nykarleby line.

Germany 

The  is a  spur line of the Prussian Eastern Railway, located in the Märkische Schweiz Nature Park in Brandenburg. This line was electrified and changed to standard gauge in 1930. It has operated as a heritage railway since 2002.

India 

Of the mountain railways of India, the Darjeeling Himalayan, Nilgiri Mountain and Kalka–Shimla Railways have been collectively designated as a UNESCO World Heritage Site. To meet World Heritage criteria, the sites must retain some of their traditional infrastructure and culture.

New Zealand

Rail transport played a major role in the history of New Zealand and several rail enthusiast societies and heritage railways have been formed to preserve New Zealand's rich rail history.

Slovakia 
The Čierny Hron Railway is a narrow-gauge railway in central Slovakia, established in the first decade of the 20th century and operating primarily as a freight railway for the local logging industry. From the late 1920s to the early 1960s, it also offered passenger transport between the villages of Hronec and Čierny Balog. The railway became Czechoslovakia's most extensive forest railway network. After its closure in 1982, it received heritage status and was restored during the following decade. Since 1992, it has been one of Slovakia's official heritage railways and is a key regional tourist attraction. The Historical Logging Switchback Railway in Vychylovka is a heritage railway in north-central Slovakia, originally built to serve the logging industry in the Orava and Kysuce regions. Despite a closure and dissasembly of most of its original network during the early 1970s, its surviving lines and branches have been (or are being) restored. The railway is owned and operated by the Museum of Kysuce, with a  line open to tourists for sightseeing.

Switzerland

Switzerland has a very dense rail network, both standard and narrow gauge. The overwhelming majority of railways, built between the mid-19th and early 20th century, are still in regular operation today and electrified, a major exception being the Furka Steam Railway, the longest unelectrified line in the country and one of the highest rail crossings in Europe. Many railway companies, especially mountain railways, provide services with well-preserved historic trains for tourists, for instance the Rigi Railways, the oldest rack railway in Europe, and the Pilatus Railway, the steepest in the world. Two railways, the Albula Railway and the Bernina Railway, have been designated as a World Heritage Site, although they are essentially operated with modern rolling stock. Due to the availability of hydroelectric resources in the Alps, the Swiss network was electrified earlier than in the rest of Europe. Some of the most emblematic pre-World War II electric locomotives and trains are the Crocodile, notably used on the Gotthard Railway, and the Red Arrow. Both are occasionally operated by SBB Historic. Switzerland also comprehends a large number of funiculars, several still working with the original carriages, such as the Giessbachbahn.

United Kingdom 

In Britain, heritage railways are often railway lines which were run as commercial railways but were no longer needed (or closed down) and were taken over or re-opened by volunteers or non-profit organisations. The large number of heritage railways in the UK is due in part to the closure of many minor lines during the 1960s' Beeching cuts, and they were relatively easy to revive. There are between 100 and 150 heritage railways in the United Kingdom.

A typical British heritage railway will use steam locomotives and original rolling stock to create a period atmosphere, although some are concentrating on diesel and electric traction to re-create the post-steam era. Many run seasonally on partial routes, unconnected to a larger network (or railway), and charge high fares in comparison with transit services; as a result, they focus on the tourist and leisure markets. During the 1990s and 2000s, however, some heritage railways aimed to provide local transportation and extend their running seasons to carry commercial passenger traffic.

The first standard-gauge line to be preserved (not a victim of Beeching) was the Middleton Railway; the second, and the first to carry passengers, was the Bluebell Railway.

Not-for-profit heritage railways differ in their quantity of service and some lines see traffic only on summer weekends. The more successful, such as the Severn Valley Railway and the North Yorkshire Moors Railway, may have up to five or six steam locomotives and operate a four-train service daily; smaller railways may run daily throughout the summer with only one steam locomotive. The Great Central Railway, the only preserved British main line with a double track, can operate over 50 trains on a busy timetable day.

After the privatisation of main-line railways, the line between not-for-profit heritage railways and for-profit branch lines may be blurred. The Romney, Hythe and Dymchurch Railway is an example of a commercial line run as a heritage operation and to provide local transportation, and the Severn Valley Railway has operated a few goods trains commercially. A number of heritage railway lines are regularly used by commercial freight operators.

Since the Bluebell Railway reopened to traffic in 1960, the definition of private standard gauge railways in the United Kingdom as preserved railways has evolved as the number of projects and their length, operating days and function have changed. The situation is further muddied by large variations in ownership-company structure, rolling stock and other assets. Unlike community railways, tourist railways in the UK are vertically integrated (although those operating mainly as charities separate their charitable and non-charitable activities for accounting purposes).

United States

Railroads 

Heritage railways are known in the United States as tourist, historic, or scenic railroads. Most are remnants of original railroads, and some are reconstructed after having been scrapped. Some heritage railways preserve entire railroads in their original state using original structures, track, and motive power.
Examples of heritage railroads in the US by preservation type:

Original
East Broad Top Railroad and Coal Company (Pennsylvania)
Nevada Northern Railway (Nevada)
California Western Railroad (California)
Stewartstown Railroad (Pennsylvania)
Arcade and Attica Railroad (New York)

Remnant
Durango and Silverton Railroad (Colorado)
Cumbres and Toltec Scenic Railroad (Colorado and New Mexico)
Hocking Valley Scenic Railway (Ohio)
Tennessee Valley Railroad Museum (Tennessee)
Strasburg Rail Road (Pennsylvania)

Reconstructed
Sumpter Valley Railway (Oregon)
Tweetsie Railroad (North Carolina)
Virginia and Truckee Railroad (Nevada)
Wiscasset, Waterville and Farmington Railway (Maine)
Fort Collins Municipal Railway (Colorado)

National Park Related Lines
Steamtown National Historic Site (Pennsylvania)
Grand Canyon Railway (Arizona)
Cuyahoga Valley Scenic Railroad (Ohio)
Golden Spike National Historical Park (Utah)

Other operations, such as the Valley Railroad or Hocking Valley Scenic Railway operate on historic track and utilize historic equipment, but are not reflective of the operations carried out by the original railroad they operate on. Hence, they do not fit into the Heritage Railway category, but rather Tourist Railway/Amusement.

Tramways 

Heritage streetcar lines are operating in over 20 U.S. cities, and are in planning or construction stages in others. Several new heritage streetcar lines have been opened since the 1970s; some are stand-alone lines while others make use of a section of a modern light rail system.

Heritage streetcar systems operating in Little Rock, Arkansas; Memphis, Tennessee; Dallas, Texas; New Orleans, Louisiana; Boston, Massachusetts (MBTA Mattapan Trolley) Philadelphia, Pennsylvania (SEPTA route 15); and Tampa, Florida, are among the larger examples. A heritage line operates in Charlotte, North Carolina, and will become a part of the city's new transit system. Another such line, called The Silver Line, operates in San Diego.

The San Francisco Municipal Railway, or Muni, runs exclusively historic trolleys on its heavily used F Market & Wharves line. The line serves Market Street and the tourist areas along the Embarcadero, including Fisherman's Wharf.

Boston's Massachusetts Bay Transportation Authority runs exclusively PCC streetcars on its Ashmont-Mattapan High Speed Line, part of that authority's Red Line. The historic rolling stock is retained because doing so cost less than would a full rebuild of the line to accommodate either a heavy rail line (like the rest of the Red Line or the Blue or Orange Lines) or a modern light rail line (like the Green Line). It is also unique in that it used almost exclusively by commuters and is not particularly popular with tourists (and thus may not really be a true heritage system, despite the historic rolling stock).

Dallas has the McKinney Avenue Transit Authority. Denver has the Platte Valley Trolley, a heritage line recalling the open-sided streetcars of the early 20th century. Old Pueblo Trolley is a volunteer-run heritage line in Tucson, Arizona; its popularity inspired, in large part, a modern streetcar system for Tucson currently in the final planning stages, which would incorporate the heritage line. The VTA in San Jose, California, also maintains a heritage trolley fleet, for occasional use on the downtown portion of a new light rail system opened in 1988. Other cities with heritage streetcar lines include Galveston, Texas; Kenosha, Wisconsin, and San Pedro, California (home of the port of Los Angeles). The National Park Service operates a system in Lowell, Massachusetts.

Most heritage streetcar lines use overhead trolley wires to power the cars, as was the case with the vast majority of original streetcar lines. However, on the Galveston Island Trolley heritage line, which opened in 1988, using modern-day replicas of vintage trolleys, the cars were powered by an on-board diesel engine, as local authorities were concerned that overhead wires would be too susceptible to damage from hurricanes. In spite of that precaution, damage in 2008 from Hurricane Ike was heavy enough to put the line out of service indefinitely, and as of 2021 it has yet to reopen, but three streetcars are being repaired and reopening is planned.

Another heritage line lacking trolley wires was Savannah's River Street Streetcar line, which opened in February 2009 and operated until around 2015. It was the first line to use a diesel/electric streetcar whose built-in electricity generator is powered by biodiesel. In El Reno, Oklahoma, the Heritage Express Trolley connects Heritage Park with downtown, using a single streetcar that has been equipped with a propane-powered on-board generator. The car formerly operated on SEPTA's Norristown High Speed Line, where third-rail current collection is used.

In Portland, Oregon, replica-vintage cars provided a heritage streetcar service, named Portland Vintage Trolley, along a section of that city's 1986-operated light rail line from 1991 to 2014. Elsewhere in Portland, the Willamette Shore Trolley is a seasonal, volunteer-operated excursion service on a former freight railroad line, to Lake Oswego, Oregon. This operation uses a diesel-powered generator on a trailer towed or pushed by the streetcar, as the line lacks trolley wires. Similarly, the Astoria Riverfront Trolley in Astoria, Oregon, is a seasonal heritage-trolley service along a section of former freight railroad and using a diesel-powered generator on a trailer to provide electricity to the streetcar.

Other seasonal or weekends-only heritage streetcar lines operate in Yakima, Washington (Yakima Electric Railway Museum); Fort Collins, Colorado; and Fort Smith, Arkansas.  The Fort Collins and Fort Smith lines are both operated by an original (as opposed to replica) Birney-type streetcar, and in both cases the individual car in use is listed on the National Register of Historic Places. In Philadelphia, the Penn's Landing Trolley operated seasonal and weekend service as a volunteer operation with former P&W equipment between September 1982 and December 17, 1995, on the Philadelphia Belt Line track on Columbus Boulevard in the historic Penn's Landing district.

Over 50 years later, the revival of extended streetcar operations in New Orleans is credited by many to the worldwide fame gained by its streetcars built by the Perley A. Thomas Car Works in 1922–23. These cars were operating on the system's Desire route made famous by Tennessee Williams' A Streetcar Named Desire.  Some Perley Thomas cars were maintained in continuous service on the St. Charles Avenue Streetcar line until Hurricane Katrina caused major damage to the right-of-way in 2005. The historic streetcars suffered only minor damage and several have been transferred to serve on the recently rebuilt Canal Street line while the St. Charles line is being repaired. New Orleans' St. Charles streetcar line is a National Historic Landmark. Pre-Katrina, New Orleans had plans to reconstruct the Desire line along its original route down St. Claude Avenue.

In San Francisco, parts of the cable car and Muni streetcar system (specifically the above-mentioned F Market & Wharves line) are heritage lines, although they are also functioning parts of the city's transit system. The cable cars are a National Historic Landmark and are rare examples of vehicles with this distinction. Located east of San Francisco is one of several museums in the U.S. that restore and operate vintage streetcars and interurbans, the Western Railway Museum.

In popular culture
The preservation of the Talyllyn Railway was the inspiration for the 1953 Ealing Studios comedy The Titfield Thunderbolt. The film is centred on the preservation of a fictional Somerset branch line from Titfield to Mallingford. Filmed on the Camerton branch in the summer of 1952, the branch was lifted after production had finished.

Many preserved railways also served as a filming location for several production companies; for example, the Keighley and Worth Valley Railway served as a filming location for the 1970 adaptation of The Railway Children.

Series three of Survivors uses heritage railways to help reestablish transportation, communication and trade in post-apocalyptic England.

See also 

 Heritage streetcar
 List of heritage railways
 Restored train
 Gandy dancer
 Wilbert Awdry

References

External links 

 UK Heritage Railways
 International Working Steam
 Scenic railways in France mainline and tourist routes
 UK Heritage Railway Photographs
 National Preservation UK's leading heritage railways forum
 Hungarian Interactive Railway Museum, Budapest 
 Henry Williams Limited

 
Engineering preservation societies